Gitiabad (also romanized as Gītīābād) is a village in Bayaz Rural District, in the Central District of Anar County, Kerman Province, Iran. At the 2006 census, its population was 218, in 55 families.

References 

Populated places in Anar County